South Mundham is a hamlet in the Chichester district of West Sussex, England. It lies in isolated countryside to the north of Pagham Harbour 1.2 miles (2 km) south of North Mundham, its larger neighbour.

References

External links

Villages in West Sussex